Harry Walfrid Nilsson (January 5, 1916 – February 2, 1993) was a Swedish football defender who played for Sweden. He also played for Landskrona BoIS and AIK.

External links
 
 

Swedish footballers
Sweden international footballers
Association football defenders
Landskrona BoIS players
1938 FIFA World Cup players
1916 births
1993 deaths